The Bakyâ or wooden clogs were once the most commonly used footwear in the Philippines before the introduction of rubber sandals.
This footwear is made from local light wood like santol and laniti. It is cut to the desired foot size before being shaven until smooth. The side of the bakyâ is thick enough to be carved with floral, geometric or landscape designs, a unique method in Southeast Asia for the artist's application of oneself towards the clog. Afterwards, the bakyâ could then be painted or varnished, traditionally, on the specification of the person who would wear it. Uppers of traditional rattan or tight cloth (or modern plastic or rubber) will then be fastened using clavitos (tiny nails). The finished product has been a symbol of the masses since its popularity. However, since the early 21st century, the usage of the bakyâ has been revived by the upper classes of society, effectively changing the symbolism of the footwear from mass representation to holistic societal representation. A bill in the Philippine Congress described the bakyâ as having 'reference to the Filipinos' humble beginnings'. It has been proposed as the National Slipper of the Philippines since 2014.

Use

The bakyâ has been in use for centuries in the Philippines, minimally in the pre-colonial era, and widely in the Spanish era in the 16th century to 18th century. Additional designs and motifs were added during the colonial era. Its peak popularity was in the 1950s during the American colonial era and was a common souvenir for Americans visiting the country. However, the bakyâ industry dwindled with the introduction of rubber slippers. By the 1990s it was rarely used although it was a common footwear used during cultural presentations and in Anito lifestyle. By the 2010s, its usage was revived by the upper levels of society and Anito adherents. In certain areas in the Philippines, the footwear is also used as gifts for weddings and a form of trophy for competition winners.

References

External links

Clogs (shoes)
Philippine footwear